The WISPA World Tour 2010 is the international squash tour and organized circuit, organized by the Women's International Squash Players Association (WISPA) for the 2010 squash season. The most important tournament in the series is the World Open held in Sharm el-Sheikh in Egypt. The tour features three categories of regular events, the World Series, which features the highest prize money and the best fields, Gold and Silver tournaments.

2010 Calendar

World Open

World Series

Gold 45

Silver 30

Silver 20

Year end world top 10 players

Retirements
Following is a list of notable players (winners of a main tour title, and/or part of the WISPA World Rankings top 30 for at least one month) who announced their retirement from professional squash, became inactive, or were permanently banned from playing, during the 2010 season:

 Natalie Grainger (born 8 July 1977 in the Manchester, England) joined the pro tour in 1996, reached the world no. 1 ranking in June 2003. She was runner-up at the World Open in 2002, and at the British Open in 2004. She won 22 WISPA World Tour titles including the Qatar Classic, the Kuala Lumpur Open, the Carol Weymuller Open and the Hurghada International. She retired in April 2011.
 Shelley Kitchen (born 2 December 1979 in the Kaitaia, New Zealand) joined the pro tour in 2000, reached the singles no. 6 spot in September 2008. She won 12 WISPA World Tour titles including the Australian Open, the Singapore Open and the Harrow Greenwich Open. She retired in February after competing of the New Zealand Open.
 Annelize Naudé (born 1 January 1977 in the Kempton Park, South Africa) joined the pro tour in 1996, reached the singles no. 13 spot in January 2006. She won 5 WISPA World Tour titles including Danish Open in 2002, Swiss Open in 2004 and reached the final of the Singapore Open in 2001. She retired in January 2010.
 Sharon Wee (born 5 October 1977 in Malacca, Malaysia) joined the pro tour in 1997, reached the singles no. 18 spot in December 2006. She won 8 WISPA World Tour titles including Japan Open in 2002 and the Berkshire Open in 2006. She retired in December 2010 after losing in quarter final of the Carol Weymuller Open in November 2010.

See also
Official Women's Squash World Ranking
Women's International Squash Players Association
2010 Women's World Team Squash Championships
WISPA World Series 2010
PSA World Tour 2010

References

External links
 WISPA calendar
 WSA website

WSA World Tour seasons
2010 in squash